Aldridge-Brownhills is a constituency in the West Midlands, represented in the House of Commons of the UK Parliament since 2015 by Wendy Morton, a Conservative.

Constituency profile
Unlike the name suggests, the constituency does not just cover Aldridge and Brownhills but also a patchwork of smaller towns and villages within Walsall, West Midlands. The seat is described as a safe seat for the Conservative party. Residents are around average in terms of wealth for the UK.

Boundaries 

1974–1983: The Urban District of Aldridge-Brownhills.

1983–2010: The Metropolitan Borough of Walsall wards of Aldridge Central and South, Aldridge North and Walsall Wood, Brownhills, Hatherton Rushall, Pelsall, and Streetly.

2010–present: The Metropolitan Borough of Walsall wards of Aldridge Central and South, Aldridge North and Walsall Wood, Brownhills, Pelsall, Rushall-Shelfield, and Streetly.

Aldridge-Brownhills constituency was created in 1974 from parts of the seats of Walsall North and Walsall South. It is one of three constituencies covering the Metropolitan Borough of Walsall. It covers the north-east and east of the borough. When held by the Labour Party, the constituency included most of Pheasey, a ward of the same name, then a stronger area for Labour than much of the rest, which was moved into Walsall South to account for population expansion in the seat.

Members of Parliament 
The constituency has had just three different MPs since its formation in February 1974. Geoff Edge of the Labour Party served the constituency from February 1974 until 1979, when it was gained by Richard Shepherd of the Conservative Party; who was to represent the constituency for thirty-six years, even withstanding the 1997 Labour landslide on a below average Conservative-to-Labour swing. In 2014 Sir Richard Shepherd announced he would not stand for re-election at the 2015 general election. Wendy Morton, was selected to replace him as the Conservative candidate, and secured the seat with a safe majority of 11,723 votes.

Elections

Elections in the 2010s

Elections in the 2000s

Elections in the 1990s

Elections in the 1980s

Elections in the 1970s

See also 
 List of parliamentary constituencies in the West Midlands (county)

Notes

References

Politics of Walsall
Parliamentary constituencies in the West Midlands (county)
Constituencies of the Parliament of the United Kingdom established in 1974
Aldridge